The 2017–18 season was Preston North End's third consecutive season in the Championship, in their 138th year in existence. Along with competing in the Championship, the club also participated in the FA Cup and EFL Cup. The season covered the period from 1 July 2017 to 30 June 2018.

Squad

 All appearances and goals up to date as of 7 May 2018.

Statistics

             

|-
!colspan=14|Player(s) out on loan:

|-
!colspan=14|Player(s) who left the club:

|}

Goals record

Disciplinary record

Contracts

Transfers

Transfers in

Transfers out

Loans in

Loans out

Pre-season

Friendlies
As of 7 June 2017, Preston North End have announced seven pre-season friendlies against Bamber Bridge, Stockport County, Morecambe, Accrington Stanley, Burnley, Fleetwood Town and Newcastle United.

Competitions

Championship

League table

Result summary

Results by matchday

Matches
On 21 June 2017, the league fixtures were announced.

FA Cup
In the FA Cup, PNE entered the competition in the third round and were drawn away to Wycombe Wanderers.

EFL Cup
On 16 June 2017, Preston North End were drawn an away tie against Accrington Stanley in the first round.

Summary

Notes

References

Preston North End
Preston North End F.C. seasons